Breed of the Border may refer to:
 Breed of the Border (1933 film), an American Western film
 Breed of the Border (1924 film), an American silent Western film